Rhyparella decempunctata is a species of ulidiid or picture-winged fly in the genus Rhyparella of the family Tephritidae.

References

Ulidiidae